Arete is a concept in ancient Greek thought that, in its most basic sense, refers to 'excellence' of any kind—especially a person or thing's "full realization of potential or inherent function." The term may also refer to excellence in "moral virtue."

The concept was also occasionally personified as a minor goddess, Arete (not to be confused with the mythological Queen Arete), who, together with sister Homonoia, formed the Praxidikai ('Exacters of Justice').

In its earliest appearance in Greek, this general notion of excellence was ultimately bound up with the notion of the fulfillment of purpose or function: the act of living up to one's full potential. A person of arete is of the highest effectiveness; they use all of their faculties—strength, bravery, and wit—to achieve real results. In the Homeric world, arete involves all of the abilities and potentialities available to humans. Though particularly associated with 'manly' qualities, the Homeric usage of the term was not necessarily gender specific, as Homer applied the term to both the Greek and Trojan heroes as well as major female figures, such as Penelope, the wife of Greek hero Odysseus. In the Homeric poems, arete is frequently associated with bravery, but more often with effectiveness.

In some contexts, arete is explicitly linked with human knowledge, where the expressions "virtue is knowledge" and "arete is knowledge" are used interchangeably. In this sense, the highest human potential is knowledge, and all other human abilities are derived from this central capacity. If arete is knowledge and study, the highest human knowledge is knowledge about knowledge itself. In this light, the theoretical study of human knowledge, which Aristotle called "contemplation", is the highest human ability and happiness.

History
The ancient Greeks applied the term arete to anything: for example, the excellence of a chimney, the excellence of a bull for breeding, and the excellence of a man. The meaning of the word changes depending on what it describes since everything has its own unique excellence; the arete of a man is different from the arete of a horse. This way of thinking originates from Plato, where it can be seen in the Allegory of the Cave. In particular, the aristocratic class was presumed, essentially by definition, to be exemplary of arete:The root of the word is the same as aristos, the word which shows superlative ability and superiority, and aristos was constantly used in the plural to denote the nobility.By the 5th and 4th centuries BC, arete as applied to men had developed to include quieter virtues, such as dikaiosyne (justice) and sophrosyne (self-restraint). Though Plato tried to produce a moral philosophy that incorporated this new usage, it was in the Nicomachean Ethics of Aristotle that the doctrine of arete found its fullest flowering. Aristotle's Doctrine of the Mean is a paradigm example of his thinking.

Aristotle is quoted as deliberating between education towards arete "...or those that are theoretical". Educating towards arete in this sense means that the boy would be educated towards things that are actually useful in life. However, even Plato himself says that arete is not something that can be agreed upon. He says, "Nor is there even an agreement about what constitutes arete, something that leads logically to a disagreement about the appropriate training for arete." To say that arete has a common definition of excellence or fulfillment may be an overstatement simply because it was very difficult to pinpoint arete, much less the proper ways to go about obtaining it.

Homer 
In Homer's Iliad and Odyssey, arete is used mainly to describe heroes and nobles and their mobile dexterity, with special reference to strength and courage, though it is not limited to this. For instance, the excellence of the gods generally included their power, but, in the Odyssey (13.42), Odysseus asked the gods to grant the Phaeacians arete, which here is generally translated as prosperity. Penelope's arete, as another example, relates to co-operation, for which she is praised by Agamemnon. As such, though particularly associated with 'manly' qualities, the Homeric usage of the term was not necessarily gender specific, as Homer applied the term to major female figures as well as the Greek and Trojan heroes.

In regards to the Iliad, the way Homer describes Achilles is an example of arete. Arete is associated with the goodness and prowess of a warrior. Hawhee (2002) points out that the norms and practices of Athenian virtuosity "operate within the politics of reputation, whose normative poles are honor and shame." This means arete functions as an external phenomenon depending on outside reception and acknowledgement for its instantiation. So, not only is Achilles a brave and brilliant warrior but also, from the outset, he is destined to die in battle at Troy with the utmost glory—a guarantor of arete.

The term is not to be confused with the mythological Queen Arete, who is mentioned in The Odyssey, and whose name in Greek is spelled  (with a different vowel in the second syllable).

Personification

Arete was occasionally personified as a goddess, the sister of Homonoia (goddess of concord, unanimity, and oneness of mind), and the daughter of Praxidike (goddess of justice). She is not to be confused with the mythological Queen Arete mentioned in the Argonautica and the Odyssey, whose name in Greek is spelled  (with a different vowel in the second syllable).

Arete and Homonoia were known jointly as the Praxidikai ('Exacters of Justice'). As with many minor Greek deities, there is little or no real mythical background to Arete, who is used at most as a personification of virtue.

The only story involving Arete was originally told in the 5th century BC by the sophist Prodicus, known as "Hercules at the crossroads" and concerns the early life of the hero Heracles. At a crossroads, Arete appeared to Heracles as a young maiden, and offered him glory and a life of struggle against evil; her counterpart Kakia, offered him wealth and pleasure. Heracles chose to follow the path of Arete.

This story was later used by Christian writers, such as Methodius of Olympus, Justin Martyr, Clement of Alexandria, and Basil of Caesarea.

Examples of usage
 In Aristotle's Nicomachean Ethics, Book 2, chapter 6: "Virtue (arete) then is a settled disposition of the mind determining the choice of actions and emotions, consisting essentially in the observance of the mean relative to us, this being determined by principle, that is, as the prudent man would determine it."
 In the Admonition of Paul in : "Finally, brethren, whatever is true, whatever is honorable, whatever is just, whatever is pure, whatever is lovely, whatever is gracious, if there is any excellence (arete), if there is anything worthy of praise, think about these things."
 Robert Pirsig uses "arete" as a synonym for "quality" in his book Zen and the Art of Motorcycle Maintenance, which includes an extensive discussion of Plato's "Phaedrus" and the historical contrast between Dialectic and Rhetoric: "And what is good, Phaedrus, And what is not good—Need we ask anyone to tell us these things?" Pirsig's line plays off a line in the Platonic dialogue The Phaedrus which reads: "And what is well and what is badly—need we ask Lysias, or any other poet or orator, who ever wrote or will write either a political or any other work, in metre or out of metre, poet or prose writer, to teach us this?"
 In a Pindarian ode inscribed on an Olympic victor's statue of Diagoras of Rhodes that is set up in Olympia: "O father Zeus, give honor to this hymn for a victor at Olympia, and to his now famous arete in boxing."
 Arete is the name of a key protagonist in The Philosopher Kings, the second book of Jo Walton's Thessaly trilogy in which a group of people gathered by the time-traveling goddess Athena work to achieve the ideal society as described in Plato's Republic. She is a precocious teenager who also appears in the sequel. Arete's name and its meaning ("excellence") is a small but important plot point in the book—as well as a general theme of the series as a whole.

Athletics 
Arete has also been used by Plato when talking about athletic training and also the education of young boys. It was commonly believed that the mind, body, and soul each had to be developed and prepared for a man to live a life of arete. This led to the thought that athletics had to be present in order to obtain arete. They did not need to take up one's life, merely exercise the body into the right condition for arete, just like the mind and soul would be exercised by other means.

Paideia 
Arete is a significant part of the paideia of ancient Greeks: the training of the boy to manhood. This training in arete included physical training, for which the Greeks developed the gymnasion; mental training, which included oratory, rhetoric, and basic sciences; and spiritual training, which included music and what is called virtue.

See also
 Aretaic turn
 Aretology
 Maturity (psychological)
 Mens sana in corpore sano ("a healthy mind in a healthy body")
 Virtue ethics
 Pirsig's metaphysics of Quality
 Virtus

References

Works cited 
 Jaeger, Werner. 1939. Paideia: The Ideals of Greek Culture, Volume I: Archaic Greece: The Mind of Athens, translated by Gilbert Highet. New York: Oxford University Press, p. 15
 Kerferd, G.B. 1967. "Arete/Agathon/Kakon," in The Encyclopedia of Philosophy, edited by P. Edwards. New York: Macmillan & The Free Press.
 Miller, Stephen G. "Ancient Greek Athletics", New Haven and London: Yale University Press, 2004
 Greek-English Lexicon, Liddell & Scott (1893: Oxford: Oxford University Press)
 
 "Homonoia: Goddess of Concord & Unanimity | Greek Mythology." www.theoi.com. n.d.

Concepts in ancient Greek ethics
Virtue
Hellenistic deities